Jacinto José Martins Godinho Santos (born 28 January 1941) is a former Portuguese footballer who played as defender.

Football career 

Santos gained 5 caps and scored 2 goals for Portugal. He made his debut 13 November 1966 in Lisbon against Sweden, in a 1-2 defeat.

|}

Honours 
Benfica
Intercontinental Cup runner-up: 1962

External links 
 
 

1941 births
Living people
Sportspeople from Matosinhos
Portuguese footballers
Association football defenders
Primeira Liga players
S.L. Benfica footballers
Portugal international footballers